John Danner (March 10, 1823 - April 12, 1918) invented and patented (May 16, 1876)  the pivot and post revolving bookcase.  His bookcase hangs suspended from a simple cast iron bearing which sits on top of an inner column or post.  The revolving mechanism consists of two nesting cast iron cones that provide a precise pivot point supporting the entire weight of the bookcase.  The top support suspension design addressed the binding and racking problems of previous bottom bearing Lazy Susan type bookcases.  "These cases, with their immense load, revolve with a slight touch of the hand; are noiseless in operation, and will last a lifetime."  Originally designed to hold 32 volumes of the Encyclopedia, it is a compact, rotating bookcase. "It is a square of 22 inches taking up no more room on the floor than an ordinary chair."

Biography
Born in Canton, Ohio.  He established the John Danner Manufacturing Company in 1874.  Yale College ordered a bookcase in 1877.  He won a gold medal at the Paris Exhibition the next year. "Several orders from Czarist Russia, kept the company busy through the panic of 1893." In 1903, a fire destroyed the entire factory.  The factory was rebuilt and ran for another 13 years.  In 1916, the Gillian Mfg. Company purchased the John Danner Manufacturing Company.

He also edited the book Old Landmarks of Canton and Stark County, Ohio, published in 1904.

References

External links 

 Advertisement for the invention
 Modern Example of the invention

1823 births
American inventors
1918 deaths
People from Canton, Ohio